Tumbes, Tumbez, or Túmbez may refer to:  

 Tumbes, Peru
 Tumbes River or Túmbez River of Ecuador and Peru in South America
 Tumbes Region in coastal Peru
 Tumbes Province, a political subdivision of Peru
 Tumbes Reserved Zone
 Tumbez, Virginia

See also
 Tumpis Indians, a people of Ecuador and Peru
 Gulf of Guayaquil-Tumbes mangroves ecoregion of Peru and Ecuador
 Manglares de Tumbes National Sanctuary of Peru